James Noël (born 1978) is a Haitian poet, writer and actor.

References

1978 births
Haitian writers
Haitian poets
Living people
Date of birth missing (living people)